The IV South American Games (Spanish: Juegos Sudamericanos; Portuguese: Jogos Sul-Americanos) were a multi-sport event held in 1990 in Lima, Peru, with some events in Arequipa (cycling and weightlifting) and Trujillo (artistic gymnastics and taekwondo). The Games were organized by the South American Sports Organization (ODESUR).  An appraisal of the games and detailed medal lists were published
elsewhere,
emphasizing the results of the Argentinian teams.

The games were officially opened by Peruvian president Alberto Fujimori. Torch lighter at the Estadio Nacional del Perú
was Olympic silver medalist, volleyball player Cecilia Tait.

Colombia rather preferred to participate at the Central American and Caribbean Games at Ciudad de México taking place almost at the same time, and sent no athletes.  Venezuela also preferred to participate at the Central American and Caribbean Games, but sent at least a small contingent of 56 athletes.

Medal count
The medal count for these Games is tabulated below. This table is sorted by the number of gold medals earned by each country.  The number of silver medals is taken into consideration next, and then the number of bronze medals.

Sports

Aquatic sports
 Swimming
 Athletics
 Baseball
 Bowling‡
 Boxing
Cycling
 Road Cycling
 Track Cycling
 Fencing
Gymnastics
 Artistic Gymnastics
 Rhythmic Gymnastics
 Judo†
 Sailing
 Shooting
 Table Tennis
 Taekwondo
 Tennis
 Weightlifting
 Wrestling

Notes
†:  The male judo competition was reserved to junior representatives (U-20).

‡: The bowling competition was reserved to junior representatives (U-20).

References

External links
Lima 90 ODESUR page

 
South American Games
S
S
S
Sports competitions in Lima
Multi-sport events in Peru
1990s in Lima
December 1990 sports events in South America